Batocera numitor, the mango-tree longicorn borer, is a species of beetle in the family Cerambycidae. It was described by Newman in 1842. It is known from China, Java, India, Laos, Nepal, Myanmar, the Philippines, Sulawesi, Sri Lanka, Thailand, Sumatra, and Vietnam. It feeds on plants including Mangifera indica and Quercus griffithii.

Subspecies
 Batocera numitor ferruginea Thomson, 1858
 Batocera numitor loki Kriesche, 1915
 Batocera numitor numitor Newman, 1842
 Batocera numitor palawanicola Kriesche, 1928
 Batocera numitor sumatrensis Aurivillius, 1922
 Batocera numitor titana Thomson, 1895

References

Batocerini
Beetles described in 1842
Taxa named by Edward Newman